Réchicourt-le-Château is a commune in the Moselle department in Grand Est in north-eastern France. It is part of the arrondissement of Sarrebourg-Château-Salins.

Until French Revolution, it was an Imperial County, which was ruled by the Counts of Ahlefeldt (1669-1751), and later by the Dukes of Richelieu.

Only after 1789 it became part of (then) Kingdom of France.

La Grande Ecluse de Réchicourt
A narrow stretch of the Canal de la Marne au Rhin from locks 6 to 1 on the western side of the summit pound which caused delays to barge traffic led to the decision to build a new lock to replace them. The lock, built alongside lock 2 and taking its number, has a rise/drop of around 15 metres and is the deepest lock on the Freycinet network. It was opened in 1965. Locks 3 to 6 are totally abandoned but lock 1 is still traversed, minus the gates. Because of this, boats heading eastwards pass from lock 7 to lock 2 and then onto the summit pound.

See also
 Communes of the Moselle department
 Parc naturel régional de Lorraine

References

External links
 

Rechicourtlechateau